Walasiho is a village in Wawo district, North Kolaka Regency in Southeast Sulawesi province. Its population is 749.

Climate
Walasiho has a subtropical highland climate (Cfb) with heavy to very heavy rainfall year-round.

References

Populated places in Southeast Sulawesi